Swallow Sidecar Company, Swallow Sidecar and Coachbuilding Company, and Swallow Coachbuilding Company were trading names used by Walmsley & Lyons, partners and joint owners of a British manufacturer of motorcycle sidecars and automobile bodies in Blackpool, Lancashire (later Coventry, Warwickshire), before incorporating a company in 1930 to own their business, which they named Swallow Coachbuilding Company Limited.

Under co-founder William Lyons, its business continued to prosper as S.S. Cars Limited and grew into Jaguar Cars Limited. The sidecar manufacturing business, by then owned by a different company, Swallow Coachbuilding Company (1935) Limited, was sold by Jaguar in January 1946 to an aircraft maintenance firm, Helliwell Group.

Lyons and Walmsley
The business was founded by two friends, William Walmsley (aged 30) and William Lyons (aged 20). Their partnership became official on Lyons's 21st birthday, 4 September 1922. Both families lived on the same street in Blackpool, England. Walmsley had previously been making sidecars and bolting them onto reconditioned motorcycles. Lyons had served his apprenticeship at Crossley Motors in Manchester before moving to a Blackpool Sunbeam dealer, Brown & Mallalieu, as a junior salesman.

Their business partnership was known by three successive trading names: Swallow Sidecar Company, Swallow Sidecar and Coachbuilding Company, and Swallow Coachbuilding Company. In 1930, a limited liability company was incorporated to own their business.

Sidecars

Swallow Sidecar
Lyons, having recognised the commercial potential for these sidecars, joined Walmsley and together they found premises in Bloomfield Road, Blackpool using a £1,000 bank overdraft obtained with the assistance of their respective fathers. With a small team of employees they were able to begin commercial production of the motorcycle sidecars. Soon they had to rent more space nearby. Then they needed still more room. Walmsley's father bought a big building in Cocker Street Blackpool which they moved into and with all the extra space began to offer to repair and paint cars and fit new hoods and upholstery. They added coach building to their business name.

Automobile bodies

Swallow Sidecar and Coachbuilding
The first car that Lyons and Walmsley worked on intending to build and sell it in any quantity was the Austin 7, a popular and inexpensive vehicle. For their show car Swallow's Bolton, Lancashire agent had persuaded a dealer in Bolton to supply him under-the-counter (coachbuilders required Austin's prior approval or warranties might be voided) with an Austin 7 chassis.

Lyons, with a sketch of what he wanted, commissioned Cyril Holland, a coachbuilder by trade, to create a distinctive, open two seater body. Holland gave it a detachable hardtop with a characteristic back window. The result was announced to public in May 1927, the Austin Seven Swallow. Austin gave their approval to the Swallow coachwork though adjustments were needed, the wings kept falling onto the tyres and the cycle type was dispensed with in favour of the more usual shape. In that form it was taken to London and shown to Henlys — Bert (Herbert Gerald) Henly and Frank Hough —  who ordered 500 both two-seaters and saloons.

Priced at only £175, the Swallow, with its brightly coloured two-tone bodywork and a style that imitated the more expensive cars of the time, proved popular in the prosperous late twenties and in the following depression. Soon after, a saloon version was produced: the Austin Seven Swallow Saloon.

Swallow Coachbuilding
During 1927 the "Sidecar" was dropped from the name, and it became the Swallow Coachbuilding Company.

Coventry

The increasing demand for Swallows made it necessary to move the company closer to the heart of the British car industry and so, in 1928, they moved to a part-disused First World War munitions factory at Holbrook Lane, Coventry. Business continued to grow and in 1929 the owners were confident enough to go to the expense of taking a stand at the London Motor Show.

Three new Swallow models appeared in 1929 on Standard, Swift, and Fiat chassis. Also in 1929 John Black and William Lyons realised a long-standing dream and produced a one of a kind sports car, This "First" SS (Standard Swallow) was a sleek Boat Tail Roadster with a flowing, streamlined design and pointed to an obvious attempt at making a fast car, possibly with the intention of venturing into racing. This car is believed to have been shipped to Australia in the late 40s.
1931 Swallow 2-door 4-seater saloon on an Austin Seven chassis

Swallow Coachbuilding Company Limited

Hornet

Bodies on the Wolseley Hornet chassis fitted in well with Swallow's planned new product range. They were the first 6-cylinder Swallows. Production began in January 1931 with an open 2-seater. A 4-seater car followed in that autumn. In April 1932 the new Special chassis arrived and these cars were quite popular. They were the last of the special-bodied Swallows, whose production was replaced in the summer of 1933 by their SS 1 tourer first announced in March 1933.

Production:

 Special Hornets: 2-seaters — 21; 4-seaters — 185
 standard Hornets: 2-seaters — 100+; 4-seaters — 224 (the quantity of 2-seaters made in the first part of 1931 is unknown)
Advertising slogan for the Wolseley Hornet-Swallow cars:"The Swallow touch that means so much".

S S One

Engines and chassis supplied by the Standard Motor Company were fitted with Swallow bodies styled under Lyons supervision. The first of the SS range of cars available to the public was the 1932 SS 1 with 2-litre or 2½-litre side-valve, six-cylinder engine and the SS 2 with a four-cylinder 1-litre side-valve engine. Initially available as coupé or tourer a saloon was added in 1934, when the chassis was modified to be 2 inches (50 mm) wider.

The success of the new range brought about a number of changes. William Walmsley wished to leave this business and it was decided to replace Walmsley's capital by bringing new outside shareholders into a brand-new incorporation, S. S. Cars Limited. The new company technically commenced business on 1 February 1934 following its incorporation 26 October 1933. Subsequently, S. S. Cars Limited bought the shares of Swallow Coachbuilding Limited as of 31 July 1934 and Swallow was liquidated (wound up) before S. S. issued shares to the public in January 1935.

After Swallow

SS Cars Limited

The continued success and expansion of their SS Jaguar range, in particular the sports and saloon cars announced in late 1935 would lead to its new name:

Jaguar Cars Limited

Towards the end of the war on 23 March 1945 the SS Cars Limited shareholders in general meeting agreed to change the company's name to Jaguar Cars Limited. Said Chairman William Lyons "Unlike S.S. the name Jaguar  is distinctive and cannot be connected or confused with any similar foreign name."

Sidecar production was now by Swallow Coachbuilding Co. (1935) Ltd. of Albion Road, Birmingham, 11.

Helliwell

In January 1946 the Helliwell Group, an aircraft maintenance firm, bought Swallow Coachbuilding Company (1935) Limited from Jaguar Cars Limited. Sidecars produced at Helliwells' Walsall Airport works were built in the same way as the originals and used the same patented trademark. They closed shop in the late 1950s.

Notes

References

External links
 Swallow sidecars images
 Swallow sidecar brochure 1936

Jaguar Cars
1920s cars
Defunct motor vehicle manufacturers of the United Kingdom
Coventry motor companies
Coachbuilders of the United Kingdom
Sidecars
Companies based in Blackpool